Asep Budi Santosa (born 19 December 1990) is an Indonesian professional footballer who plays as a defender for Liga 2 club PSPS Riau. Previously, he played for several other Indonesian clubs, such as Persik Kediri, Persela Lamongan, Persiba Balikpapan and Persita Tangerang.

Club career

Persita Tangerang
He was signed for Persita Tangerang to play in Liga 2 in the 2019 season.

Persiraja Banda Aceh
The newly promoted club, Persiraja Banda Aceh, confirmed that Asep Budi will play for them to compete in 2020 Liga 1. This season was suspended on 27 March 2020 due to the COVID-19 pandemic. The season was abandoned and was declared void on 20 January 2021.

Persis Solo
In 2021, Asep Budi signed a contract with Indonesian Liga 2 club Persis Solo.

PSPS Riau
Asep was signed for PSPS Riau to play in Liga 2 in the 2022–23 season. He made his league debut on 29 August 2022 in a match against Semen Padang at the Riau Main Stadium, Riau.

Honours

Club
Persita Tangerang
 Liga 2 runner-up: 2019

References

External links
 
 Asep Budi at Liga Indonesia

Indonesian footballers
1990 births
Living people
Association football defenders
Persiraja Banda Aceh players
People from Garut
21st-century Indonesian people